Petrovice (German Petrowitz) is a borough of Prague, Czech Republic. Petrovice is located in the south eastern part of the city. Petrovice is an independent municipality with its own city hall and city assembly. It is part of the Prague 15 administrative district. It has about 6,151 inhabitants. Petrovice used to be a village founded in the 13th century, while today it is an integrated part of Prague. There is a chateau here as well.

External links 

 

Districts of Prague